The 2012–13 Sacred Heart Pioneers men's basketball team represented Sacred Heart University during the 2012–13 NCAA Division I men's basketball season. This was the Pioneers' 14th season of NCAA Division I basketball, all played in the Northeast Conference. The Pioneers were coached by Dave Bike in his thirty-fifth year as Sacred Heart's head coach.  SHU played their home games at the William H. Pitt Center. They finished the season 9–20, 7–11 in NEC play to finish in ninth place. They failed to qualify for the Northeast Conference Basketball tournament.

Roster

Schedule

|-
!colspan=9|Regular Season

References 

Sacred Heart Pioneers men's basketball seasons
Sacred Heart
Sacred Heart Pioneers men's b
Sacred Heart Pioneers men's b